Polje Bijela (Cyrillic: Поље Бијела) is a village in the municipality of Konjic, Bosnia and Herzegovina.

Demographics 
According to the 2013 census, its population was 1,402.

References

Populated places in Konjic